Horrie Seden (born 6 April 1946) is an Australian former professional darts player who played members in the British Darts Organisation (BDO) in the 1980s.

Career
Born in Darwin, Northern Territory, Seden won the 1984 Australian Grand Masters and played in the 1984 Winmau World Masters, losing in the first round to Ceri Morgan.

Seden then played in the 1988 BDO World Darts Championship but lost in the first round 3–2 in sets to Bob Sinnaeve.

Seden quit the BDO in 1988.

World Championship results

BDO
 1988: Last 32: (lost to Bob Sinnaeve 2–3) (sets)

References

External links
Profile and stats at Darts Database

Australian darts players
Living people
1946 births
British Darts Organisation players
People from Darwin, Northern Territory